Zinc finger protein 830 is a protein that in humans is encoded by the ZNF830 gene.

References

Further reading